Samuel (Sameli) Nestor Rajala (13 December 1858, Teuva - 23 December 1948; original surname Snellman) was a Finnish farmer, lay preacher and politician. He was a member of the Parliament of Finland from 1907 to 1910, representing the Finnish Party.

References

1858 births
1948 deaths
People from Teuva
People from Vaasa Province (Grand Duchy of Finland)
Finnish Lutherans
Finnish Party politicians
Members of the Parliament of Finland (1907–08)
Members of the Parliament of Finland (1908–09)
Members of the Parliament of Finland (1909–10)